Arpa-Tektir is a village in the Chüy District of Chüy Region, Kyrgyzstan. Its population was 843 in 2021. The village is subordinated to Kegeti rural community (ayyl aymagy).

References

Populated places in Chüy Region